St. Vincent College of Commerce was established by the Jesuits in 1970 and is affiliated to the University of Pune.

History
The college was started in 1970.  In 1979, the junior college was added, and in 1981 the post-graduate program (M.Com). This made St. Vincent College a full-fledged commerce college. In 2001, the Girls Association "Mother Teresa Vidyarthini Manch" was set up. The Ex-Students Association (VINCA) began officially in May 2011. In 2012, the college inaugurated the Diploma in Banking & Financial Management in collaboration with Loyola Institute of Business Administration (LIBA), Chennai, and the new specialization of Business Administration for M.Com. In 2014, M.Com received permanent affiliation with Pune University for the specialization "Advanced Accounting and Taxation," the same year the college received permanent affiliation. College news letter Streams and the college annual magazine were restarted in the academic year 2010–11. In 2015 the Junior College began daytime operations.

In 2013, over 53 colleges took part in a contest held for colleges across India. A team of 11 students from St Vincent College participated in various competitions and won the "Best College Trophy".

See also
 List of Jesuit sites

References  

Universities and colleges in Pune
Colleges in India
Jesuit universities and colleges in India
Educational institutions established in 1970
1970 establishments in Maharashtra